Zavyalovsky District (Zavjal joros / Deri joros) is an administrative and municipal district (raion), one of the twenty-five in the Udmurt Republic, Russia. It is located in the southern central part of the republic. Its administrative center is the rural locality (a selo) of Zavyalovo. Population:  The population of Zavyalovo accounts for 13.6% of the district's total population.

References

Notes

Sources

Districts of Udmurtia